Hafis Alakkaparamba Mohammedali (born 28 June 1994) is an Indian professional football player who plays as a forward for All India Sevens side Royal Travels FC BLACK & WHITE KOZHIKODE

Early life 
Mohammedali was born on 28 June 1994 in Kerala, India.

Career

Churchill Brothers S.C.

2019-20 
On 2019, Mohammedali started his senior career by signing for the I-League side Churchill Brothers S.C. He played his debut match for the club on 2 February 2020 in a match against NEROCA F.C. by coming in as a substitute for Dawda Ceesay during the 87th minute of the game which they 4–1. Mohammedali played his second match on 15 February 2020 against Aizawl F.C, where he started in the lineup before being substituted in the 59th minute of the game for Quan Gomez. The match ended 2–1 in favor of Churchill Brothers.

2020-21 
Mohammedali played his first match of the season against Aizawl in a 0–0 draw on 3 February 2021 as a substitute for Kingslee Fernandes in the 87th minute of the game. He played his next match as a starter in the lineup against Real Kashmir FC on 8 February, which ended in a 0–0 draw. He played his next match as a substitute against Gokulam Kerala FC on 10 March 2021 which they lost 0–3. Mohammedali played his last match of the season against TRAU FC on 21 March, which ended up in a 1–1 draw.

Career statistics

References

External links 

 

1994 births
Living people
Sportspeople from Kozhikode
Indian footballers
Churchill Brothers FC Goa players
Association football forwards
Footballers from Kerala
I-League players
I-League 2nd Division players
Kerala United FC players